NDA may stand for:

Military
 National Defence Academy (India), a military academy in India
 National Defence Act, legislation for organizing and funding Canada's military
 National Defense Academy of Japan, a military academy in Japan
 Nigerian Defence Academy, a military academy in Nigeria
 Niger Delta Avengers, a militant group in Nigeria's Niger Delta

Organizations
 National Dance Alliance, sister company of the National Cheer Association
 National Dance Association, defunct association of the American Alliance for Health, Physical Education, Recreation and Dance
 National Dental Association, an association for African-American dentists
 Net Daemons Associates, a computer network and systems administration company
 New Dutch Academy, an orchestra in The Hague, Netherlands
 National Democratic Assembly, the English name of the Israeli political party Balad
 National Disability Authority, an agency of the Irish Department of Children, Equality, Disability, Integration and Youth
 National Democratic Alliance, a coalition of political parties in India
 Northern Domestic Airspace, a Canadian aviation organization
 Nuclear Decommissioning Authority, an entity of the UK government

Music
 "NDA" (song), a 2021 song by Billie Eilish
 "NDA", a song by Megan Thee Stallion from the album Traumazine, 2022

Other
 National Design Awards, awards given by the American National Design Museum
 New Drug Application, to get a new drug approved in the United States by the Food and Drug Administration
 Non-destructive analysis, a way to evaluate a material's properties without destroying it
 Non-disclosure agreement, a legal contract regarding confidentiality
 Notre Dame Academy, Patna, a girls' Roman Catholic secondary school in Patna, India
 Najran Domestic Airport, an airport in Najran, Saudi Arabia
 Nicolas Dupont-Aignan, a French politician

See also 
 National Democratic Alliance (disambiguation)
 National Defence Academy (disambiguation)
 Naval Defence Act (disambiguation)